Channel i is a Bangladeshi Bengali-language satellite and cable television channel owned by Impress Group. It was launched on 1 October 1999, as Bangladesh's first digital television channel. It is one of the oldest satellite television channels in Bangladesh. Channel i is broadcast via satellite television using PanAm Sat and Bangabandhu-1, covering most of Asia and parts of Australia. It is sister to the radio station, Radio Bhumi.

Background 
The Impress Group first moved beyond textile production and into television in the early 1980s, under the tutelage of Faridur Reza Sagor, who had before worked at state-run Bangladesh Television on a freelance basis. The initial steps into television resulted into the establishment of Impress Telefilm, which initially produced small mini-series and one-off shows for BTV.

History 
Channel i began broadcasting on 1 October 1999 from a small building in the Siddheshwari neighborhood of Dhaka, with the "Hridoye Bangladesh" (হৃদয়ে বাংলাদেশ) slogan, which is still used as of today. It initially broadcast pre-recorded television programs for 12 hours, but was converted to a 24-hour channel within two years of its launch. 

On 1 October 2001, Channel i began airing news programming. The channel launched its website on 30 September 2003. Channel i's news director, Shykh Seraj, created Hridoye Mati O Manush, based on the old Bangladesh Television program Mati O Manush, which debuted on the channel on 21 February 2004. In March 2008, the channel began broadcasting Sisimpur to Bangladeshi children worldwide. Channel i had also broadcast modern western-themed telefilms, such as Play, directed by M-SIB, in 2010, thus making them the first Bangladeshi television channel to do so. On 11 June 2015, BBC Bangla's BBC Probaho premiered on Channel i.

Channel i was one of the nine Bangladeshi television channels to sign an agreement with Bdnews24.com to subscribe to a video-based news agency run by children called Prism in May 2016. Channel i began high definition broadcasts on 15 September 2017, and fully migrated from standard definition broadcasts on 1 October. For Bangladesh Television's 55th anniversary on 25 December 2019, Channel i organized a special program in its headquarters in Tejgaon, which was broadcast on both networks.

Programming

Current and former 
 420
 BBC Bangladesh Shonglap
 BBC Probaho
 Channel i Music Awards
 Dainik Tolpar
 Ekjon Mayaboti
 Ghor Kutum
 Hridoye Mati O Manush
 Kafela (only during Ramadan)
 Lux Channel I Superstar
 Priyo Din Priyo Rat
 Sakin Sarisuri
 Saat Bhai Champa
 Sonar Pakhi Rupar Pakhi
 Sisimpur
 Tritiyo Matra
 Vober Hat

Audience share 
In 2010, Channel i held a total audience share of 36%, tied with ATN Bangla. In urban areas, the channel had an audience share of 62%, the highest among privately owned channels in Bangladesh, and in metropolitan areas, it had a share of 61%. Channel i was ranked highest among most watched television channels in Bangladesh during its founding anniversary in 2013.

See also
 List of television stations in Bangladesh
 Keka Ferdousi

References

 
Television channels and stations established in 1999
Television channels in Bangladesh
Foreign television channels broadcasting in the United Kingdom
Mass media in Dhaka
1999 establishments in Bangladesh